Bârsana is a commune in Maramureș County, Maramureș, Romania. It is composed of two villages, Bârsana and Nănești (Nánfalva). It also included Oncești village until 2004, when it was split off to form a separate commune. As of 2002, Bârsana had 6,352 inhabitants, all but ten of whom were ethnic Romanians.  86.7% were Romanian Orthodox, 7.8% Greek-Catholic and 3.1% Pentecostal.

Bârsana's Church of the Presentation of the Virgin in the Temple is one of eight Wooden churches of Maramureș listed as a UNESCO World Heritage Site. After the Romanian Revolution of 1989, another wooden monastery was built in Bârsana.

References

Communes in Maramureș County
Localities in Romanian Maramureș